Henry Charles Lacy (1799 – 1869) was a British Whig politician.

Lacy became a Whig Member of Parliament (MP) for Bodmin at the 1847 general election, but stood down at the next election in 1852.

References

External links
 

UK MPs 1847–1852
Whig (British political party) MPs for English constituencies
1799 births
1869 deaths
Members of the Parliament of the United Kingdom for Bodmin